Wine gums (or winegums) are chewy, firm pastille-type sweets similar to gumdrops without the sugar coating, originating from the United Kingdom. All brands have their own recipes containing various sweeteners, flavourings, and colourings. Wine gums are popular in the United Kingdom, Canada, Ireland, South Africa and many Commonwealth nations, as well as several European countries. Common brands include Maynards, Bassett's and Lion.

The gums usually come in five shapes: kidney, crown, rhombus, circle and oblong, and are usually labelled with the name of a wine: for example, Maynards use port, sherry, champagne, burgundy, and claret; other manufacturers may prefer different names such as rioja, merlot or rum. Despite the name, they usually contain no alcohol. Depending on local laws or manufacturer's practices, packages may bear a specific statement that the sweets "contain no wine."

History
Charles Riley Maynard started his business in 1880 by producing confections in a kitchen with his brother Tom in Stamford Hill, London, while his wife Sarah Ann served the customers. Maynards sweets grew steadily and was launched as a company in 1896. Maynards Wine Gums were introduced in 1909 by Maynard's son Charles Gordon Maynard. It took Charles Gordon Maynard some time to persuade his strict Methodist and teetotaller father that the sweets did not contain wine, after which the father accepted that the sweet was to be marketed as an alternative to alcohol.

According to confectionery company Cadbury, red and black are the most popular colours. The red flavours are traditionally red berry, strawberry, or raspberry-flavoured in the United Kingdom and cherry in the United States. Black is traditionally blackcurrant flavoured. Limited-edition dark-only wine gum issues have occurred, and in 2010, a limited "fruit duos" edition was produced with two colours and flavours on each gum.

See also
Bubble gum
Chewing gum
DOTS
Grether's Pastilles
Gumdrop
Gummy candy
Jelly baby
Jujube
Jujyfruits
Midget Gems (also known as Mini Gems)
Rowntree's Fruit Pastilles
Swedish Fish

References

External links
Maynards information from Cadbury, UK

English inventions
British confectionery
Candy
Gummi candies
Products introduced in 1909